Saren Joseph Simitian (born February 1, 1953) is a California Democratic politician. From 2004 to 2012, he was the State Senator representing California's 11th State Senate district, which encompasses all or part of 13 cities in San Mateo, Santa Clara, and Santa Cruz counties. Approaching his term limit at the end of 2012, he ran for and was elected as a Santa Clara County Supervisor. He was re-elected to the same seat in 2016 and again in 2020.

Education
 Palo Alto High School Class of 1970
 Bachelor of Arts in Political Science, cum laude (with academic honors), Colorado College
 Master of Arts, International Policy Studies, Stanford University
 Master of City Planning, University of California, Berkeley
 Juris Doctor, University of California, Berkeley School of Law

Early political career
Simitian was President of the Palo Alto School Board, and served as a member from 1983 to 1991. He was on the Palo Alto City Council from 1992 to 1996 and served as Mayor for part of that time.

California state legislature

State Assembly 
Simitian was elected to the California State Assembly's 21st District in November 2000, and re-elected to a second term in November 2002.

State Senate
Simitian was elected to the California State Senate in November 2004 for District 11. He defeated former Assemblyman and San Mateo County Supervisor Ted Lempert in the Democratic primary election, also prevailing in the general election. Simitian was re-elected to a second term in 2008. His second term ended in 2012. Simitian was one of only four Democratic Senators to vote against California's ambitious High Speed Rail plan.

Simitian authored California's hands-free cell phone bill.

Azerbaijan's Foreign Ministry has put Simitian on a list of individuals banned from entering the country. The decision was made after Simitian travelled to Nagorno-Karabakh without Baku's permission.

Santa Clara County Board of Supervisors
Simitian served as President of the Santa Clara County Board of Supervisors in 2018 and 2019, and after winning reelection in 2020, continues to represent District 5 (Los Altos, Los Altos Hills, Palo Alto, Cupertino, Mountain View, Saratoga, and Stanford, as well as portions of San Jose).  He was first elected to the Board of Supervisors in November 1996, serving from 1997 to 2000.  In 2022, redistricting adjusted the cities Simitian represents to include Los Gatos and Monte Sereno.

Simitian was elected again to the District 5 seat of the Board of Supervisors in 2012, after reaching his term limit in the State Senate.  He was re-elected in 2016 with 89 percent of the vote and ran unopposed for re-election in 2020.

As Supervisor, Simitian is credited with saving the 400 units of affordable housing at the Buena Vista Mobile Home Park, and he has proposed the building of affordable teacher housing in Palo Alto for teachers across the county. He also successfully pushed the County to fund multiple new playgrounds accessible to special needs children, following the creation of Palo Alto's Magical Bridge Playground. 
 
Simitian has advanced multiple privacy-related initiatives at the county level. Under his guidance, Santa Clara County became "one of the first in the country" to hire a privacy specialist in a designated role to oversee its data-driven programs.  He also secured passage of a surveillance ordinance, the first of its kind in the United States, requiring that police forces get explicit permission for new surveillance technology.

Simitian pushed for more civilian oversight for Sheriff and county jails and secured approval for body-worn cameras for Sheriff's Deputies and jail guards.

Personal life
Joe Simitian is married to Mary Hughes, a Bay Area political consultant. Simitian proposed to Hughes on election night in 1996 upon being elected to the Santa Clara County Board of Supervisors.

References

External links
 Campaign website
 Ballotpedia
 Election History – Join California

1953 births
Living people
American businesspeople
American diplomats
American people of Armenian descent
California city council members
County supervisors in California
California lawyers
Democratic Party California state senators
Colorado College alumni
Democratic Party members of the California State Assembly
Palo Alto High School alumni
Mayors of Palo Alto, California
School board members in California
Stanford University alumni
University of California, Berkeley alumni
UC Berkeley School of Law alumni
21st-century American politicians
Ethnic Armenian politicians